Arthur Kaye (9 May 1933 – 12 October 2003) was an English footballer who played in The Football League as a winger.

Career
Born in Higham, Barnsley, in the West Riding of Yorkshire, he played for local club Barnsley, followed by Blackpool, Middlesbrough and Colchester United before retiring. Kaye also played for the England under-23 team. He died at his home in Higham, near Barnsley, following a short illness on 12 October 2003.

Honours

Club
Barnsley
 Football League Third Division North Winner (1): 1954–55
 Football League Third Division North Runner-up (1): 1953–54

References

External links
Arthur Kaye Career Stats at Neil Brown's
Player Profile - Arthur Kaye

1933 births
2003 deaths
English footballers
Colchester United F.C. players
Barnsley F.C. players
Blackpool F.C. players
Middlesbrough F.C. players
England under-23 international footballers
English Football League players
English Football League representative players
Footballers from Barnsley
Association football wingers